Senator Pendleton may refer to:

Members of the United States Senate
Florence Pendleton (1926–2020), shadow U.S. Senator from the District of Columbia from 1991 to 2007
George H. Pendleton (1825–1889), U.S. Senator from Ohio from 1879 to 1885

United States state senate members
Charles S. Pendleton (1880–1952), Virginia State Senate
Joey Pendleton (born 1946), Kentucky State Senate
Nathanael G. Pendleton (1793–1861), Ohio State Senate
Peggy Pendleton (born 1946), Maine State Senate